A cymbal is a common percussion instrument. Often used in pairs, cymbals consist of thin, normally round plates of various alloys. The majority of cymbals are of indefinite pitch, although small disc-shaped cymbals based on ancient designs sound a definite note (such as crotales). Cymbals are used in many ensembles ranging from the orchestra, percussion ensembles, jazz bands, heavy metal bands, and marching groups. Drum kits usually incorporate at least a crash, ride, or crash/ride, and a pair of hi-hat cymbals. A player of cymbals is known as a cymbalist.

Etymology and names 

The word cymbal is derived from the Latin cymbalum, which is the latinisation of the Greek word  kymbalon, "cymbal", which in turn derives from  kymbē, "cup, bowl".

In orchestral scores, cymbals may be indicated by the French cymbales; German Becken, Schellbecken, Teller, or Tschinellen; Italian piatti or cinelli; and Spanish platillos. Many of these derive from the word for plates.

History 

Cymbals have existed since ancient times. Representations of cymbals may be found in reliefs and paintings from Armenian Highlands (7th century BC), Larsa, Babylon, Assyria, ancient Egypt, ancient Greece, and ancient Rome. References to cymbals also appear throughout the Bible, through many Psalms and songs of praise to God. Cymbals may have been introduced to China from Central Asia in the 3rd or 4th century AD.

India
In India, cymbals have been in use since ancient times and are still used across almost all major temples and Buddhist sites. Gigantic aartis along the Ganges, which are revered by Hindus all over the world, are incomplete without large cymbals.

Central Asia and Iran

The Shahnameh (circa 977 and 1010 CE) mentions the use of cymbals at least 14 times in its text, most in the context of creating a loud din in war, to frighten the enemy or to celebrate. The Persian word is sanj or senj (Persian سنج), but the Shahnameh doesn't claim these to be Persian in origin. Several times it calls then "Indian cymbals." Other adjectives to describe them include "golden" and "brass," and to play them is to "clash" them.

A different form is called sanj angshati (سنج انگشتی) or finger cymbals.  These are zill.

Ashura ceremony 
Besides the original use in war, another use in Persian culture was the Ashura ceremony. 
Originally in the ceremony, two pieces of stone were beaten on the sides of the mourner with special movements accompanied by a lamentation song. This has been replaced by beating Karbzani or Karebzani and playing sanj and ratchets. Cities where this has been performed include Lahijan and Aran of Kashan, as well as Semnan and Sabzevar.

Etymology
See Zang
All theories about the etymology of the word Sanj, identify it as a Pahlavi word. By some accounts means weight; and it is possible that the original term was sanjkūb meaning ”striking weights” [against each other]. By some accounts the word is reform version of "Zang" (bell), referring to its bell-shaped plate.

Turkey

Cymbals were employed by Turkish janissaries in the 14th century or earlier. By the 17th century, such cymbals were used in European music, and more commonly played in military bands and orchestras by the mid 18th century. Since the 19th century, some composers have called for larger roles for cymbals in musical works, and a variety of cymbal shapes, techniques, and hardware have been developed in response.

Anatomy 
The anatomy of the cymbal plays a large part in the sound it creates. A hole is drilled in the center of the cymbal, which is used to either mount the cymbal on a stand or for tying straps through (for hand playing). The bell, dome, or cup is the raised section immediately surrounding the hole. The bell produces a higher "pinging" pitch than the rest of the cymbal. The bow is the rest of the surface surrounding the bell. The bow is sometimes described in two areas: the ride and crash area. The ride area is the thicker section closer to the bell while the crash area is the thinner tapering section near the edge. The edge or rim is the immediate circumference of the cymbal.

Cymbals are measured by their diameter either in inches or centimeters. The size of the cymbal affects its sound, larger cymbals usually being louder and having longer sustain. The weight describes how thick the cymbal is. Cymbal weights are important to the sound they produce and how they play. Heavier cymbals have a louder volume, more cut, and better stick articulation (when using drum sticks). Thin cymbals have a fuller sound, lower pitch, and faster response.

The profile of the cymbal is the vertical distance of the bow from the bottom of the bell to the cymbal edge (higher profile cymbals are more bowl-shaped). The profile affects the pitch of the cymbal: higher profile cymbals have higher pitch.

Types

Orchestral cymbals 
Cymbals offer a composer nearly endless amounts of color and effect. Their unique timbre allows them to project even against a full orchestra and through the heaviest of orchestrations and enhance articulation and nearly any dynamic. Cymbals have been utilized historically to suggest frenzy, fury or bacchanalian revels, as seen in the Venus music in Wagner's Tannhäuser, Grieg's Peer Gynt suite, and Osmin's aria "O wie will ich triumphieren" from Mozart's Die Entführung aus dem Serail.

Clash cymbals 

Orchestral clash cymbals are traditionally used in pairs, each one having a strap set in the bell of the cymbal by which they are held. Such a pair is known as clash cymbals, crash cymbals, hand cymbals, or plates. Certain sounds can be obtained by rubbing their edges together in a sliding movement for a "sizzle", striking them against each other in what is called a "crash", tapping the edge of one against the body of the other in what is called a "tap-crash", scraping the edge of one from the inside of the bell to the edge for a "scrape" or "zischen", or shutting the cymbals together and choking the sound in what is called a "hi-hat" or "crush". A skilled percussionist can obtain an enormous dynamic range from such cymbals. For example, in Beethoven's Symphony No. 9, the percussionist is employed to first play cymbals pianissimo, adding a touch of colour rather than loud crash.

Crash cymbals are usually damped by pressing them against the percussionist's body. A composer may write laissez vibrer, or, "let vibrate" (usually abbreviated l.v.), secco (dry), or equivalent indications on the score; more usually, the percussionist must judge when to damp based on the written duration of a crash and the context in which it occurs. Crash cymbals have traditionally been accompanied by the bass drum playing an identical part. This combination, played loudly, is an effective way to accentuate a note since it contributes to both very low and very high-frequency ranges and provides a satisfying "crash-bang-wallop". In older music the composer sometimes provided one part for this pair of instruments, writing senza piatti or piatti soli if only one is needed. This came from the common practice of having one percussionist play using one cymbal mounted to the shell of the bass drum. The percussionist would crash the cymbals with the left hand and use a mallet to strike the bass drum with the right. This method is nowadays often employed in pit orchestras and called for specifically by composers who desire a certain effect. Stravinsky calls for this in his ballet Petrushka, and Mahler calls for this in his Titan Symphony. The modern convention is for the instruments to have independent parts. However, in kit drumming, a cymbal crash is still most often accompanied by a simultaneous kick to the bass drum, which provides a musical effect and support to the crash.

Hi hats 

Crash cymbals evolved into the low-sock and from this to the modern hi-hat. Even in a modern drum kit, they remain paired with the bass drum as the two instruments which are played with the player's feet. However, hi-hat cymbals tend to be heavy with little taper, more similar to a ride cymbal than to a clash cymbal as found in a drum kit, and perform a ride rather than a crash function.

Suspended cymbal 

Another use of cymbals is the suspended cymbal. This instrument takes its name from the traditional method of suspending the cymbal by means of a leather strap or rope, thus allowing the cymbal to vibrate as freely as possible for maximum musical effect. Early jazz drumming pioneers borrowed this style of cymbal mounting during the early 1900s and later drummers further developed this instrument into the mounted horizontal or nearly horizontally mounted "crash" cymbals of a modern drum kit instead of a leather strap suspension system. Many modern drum kits use a mount with felt or otherwise dampening fabric to act as a barrier to hold the cymbals between metal clamps: thus forming the modern-day ride cymbal. Suspended cymbals can be played with yarn-, sponge-, or cord wrapped mallets. The first known instance of using a sponge-headed mallet on a cymbal is the final chord of Hector Berlioz' Symphonie Fantastique. Composers sometimes specifically request other types of mallets like felt mallets or timpani mallets for different attack and sustain qualities. Suspended cymbals can produce bright and slicing tones when forcefully struck, and give an eerie transparent "windy" sound when played quietly. A tremolo, or roll (played with two mallets alternately striking on opposing sides of the cymbal) can build in volume from almost inaudible to an overwhelming climax in a satisfyingly smooth manner (as in Humperdinck's Mother Goose Suite). The edge of a suspended cymbal may be hit with the shoulder of a drum stick to obtain a sound somewhat akin to that of clash cymbals. Other methods of playing include scraping a coin or triangle beater rapidly across the ridges on the top of the cymbal, giving a "zing" sound (as some percussionists do in the fourth movement of Dvořák's Symphony No. 9). Other effects that can be used include drawing a bass bow across the edge of the cymbal for a sound like squealing car brakes.

Ancient cymbals 
Ancient, antique or tuned cymbals are much more rarely called for. Their timbre is entirely different, more like that of small hand-bells or of the notes of the keyed harmonica. They are not struck full against each other, but by one of their edges, and the note given in by them is higher in proportion as they are thicker and smaller. Berlioz's Romeo and Juliet calls for two pairs of cymbals, modeled on some old Pompeian instruments no larger than the hand (some are no larger than a large coin), and tuned to F and B flat. The modern instruments descended from this line are the crotales.

List of cymbal types 

Cymbal types include:
 Bell cymbal
 China cymbal
 Clash cymbal
 Crash cymbal
 Crash/ride cymbal
 Finger cymbal
 Flat ride cymbal
 Hi-hat
 Ride cymbal
 Sizzle cymbal
 Splash cymbal
 Swish cymbal
 Suspended cymbal
 Taal – Indian cymbal (clash cymbal)

See also 
 Cymbal making and Cymbal alloys
 Cymbal manufacturers
 Percussion instruments
 Drum and Drum kit
 Taal
 Zill

References

Citations

Bibliography

External links 

Orchestral cymbal playing, with an excellent short history of cymbals
Cymbal Colour Exploration, A 3D binaural audio recording of different cymbal sound colours

 
Drum kit components
Early musical instruments
Idiophones
Metal percussion instruments
Military music
Orchestral percussion instruments
Unpitched percussion instruments